This is a list of drafted Frölunda HC players, players who have been drafted in the National Hockey League (NHL) Entry Draft and played the season prior to the draft for the Frölunda ice hockey organization. There have been 90 players drafted in the NHL Entry Draft from the Frölunda organization. Most of the players on this list were drafted from Frölunda's junior team which is the most successful junior team in Sweden, having won more Anton Cups (10) than any other team.

Fourteen Frölunda players have been selected in the first round of the NHL Entry Draft. The highest draft selection was Rasmus Dahlin, who was drafted first overall in the 2018 NHL Entry Draft. The most-recent first-round selection was Simon Edvinsson, sixth overall in the 2021 NHL Entry Draft. The most notable players drafted from Frölunda are; Calle Johansson, who played 1,109 regular season games in the NHL, Daniel Alfredsson who won the Calder Memorial Trophy as the NHL Rookie of the Year in 1996 and the King Clancy Memorial Trophy for leadership qualities and humanitarian contribution in his community in 2012, Henrik Lundqvist who won the Vezina Trophy in 2012 as the league's top goaltender, and Erik Karlsson who became the second youngest player to win the James Norris Memorial Trophy, awarded to the NHL's best defenceman.

Two players were drafted as overage players, having played several seasons at a professional level: Ronnie Sundin, drafted by the New York Rangers in the 1996 NHL Entry Draft at age 26, and Jonas Johnson, drafted by the St. Louis Blues in the 2002 NHL Entry Draft at age 32. Five pair of siblings have been drafted: brothers Mikael & Niklas Andersson, Carl & John Klingberg, Erik & Anton Karlsson, as well as two sets of twins, Joel & Henrik Lundqvist and Fred & John Wikner.

Drafted players

Footnotes

References

 
 
 
 
 
 
 

Players in the NHL Entry Draft
NHL Entry Draft selections
Lists of players selected in the NHL Entry Draft